Colonia Santa Rosa is a town and municipality in Salta Province in northwestern Argentina.

Climate

References

Populated places in Salta Province